Affectionately (April 26, 1960 – 1979) was an American Thoroughbred racehorse.

Background
She was sired by 1956 American Horse of the Year Swaps, out of the racing mare Searching.  Searching's dam was Big Hurry, by Black Toney out of La Troienne.  Searching's sire was War Admiral, winner of the American Triple Crown of Thoroughbred Racing, whose own sire was Man o' War .

Foaled on April 26, 1960, at the farm of Dr. Charles Hagyard  near Lexington, Kentucky, she was bred by the partnership of owner/trainer Hirsch Jacobs and Isidor Bieber.

Racing career
Campaigned under the name of Jacobs' wife Ethel, Affectionately won nine of her first ten starts as a two-year-old.  In the Matron Stakes she was finally beaten by Smart Deb.

At ages three and four Affectionately was very good, winning two Interborough Handicaps, the Vosburgh, and the Correction Handicap. When she turned five, however, she gained the successes that put her on the list of the 100 best racehorses of the twentieth century.  Under high weights, she took the Top Flight Handicap, the Vagrancy Handicap and a number of other important stakes races.  She retired sound with eighteen stakes wins, one of only two females to break the half-million-dollar earnings mark.

Retirement
Her first foal was 1970 co-American Horse of the Year Personality, who shared the honor with Fort Marcy. Affectionately produced three other foals, of which one started and won.

She died in 1979.  Ten years later, she was voted into the Hall of Fame, an honor her dam, Searching, was accorded the year before.

Assessment and honors
At the end of 1962, Affectionately was voted American Champion Two-Year-Old Filly by Turf & Sport Digest. The rival Thoroughbred Racing Association and Daily Racing Form awards were won by Smart Deb.

Jacobs, who was a Hall of Fame conditioner, called her "the best horse I've ever trained". Jacobs had trained Stymie and Hail to Reason.

In the Blood-Horse magazine List of the Top 100 U.S. Racehorses of the 20th Century, with Affectionately's great-granddamsire at #1, her damsire at #13, her sire at #20 and Affectionately herself at #81, Affectionately's heritage continues a tradition of Thoroughbred breeding and racing at its best

Pedigree

References

1960 racehorse births
1979 racehorse deaths
American Champion racehorses
Racehorses bred in Kentucky
Racehorses trained in the United States
United States Thoroughbred Racing Hall of Fame inductees
Thoroughbred family 1-x